NCAA Football 2000 is a video game of the sports genre released in 1999 by EA Sports. Its cover athlete is former University of Texas running back Ricky Williams.

Reception

The game received favorable reviews according to the review aggregation website GameRankings.

References

External links
 

1999 video games
College football video games
Electronic Arts games
NCAA video games
North America-exclusive video games
PlayStation (console) games
PlayStation (console)-only games
Video games set in 2000
Video games developed in the United States